Winner Take All  is a 1939 American drama film directed by Otto Brower and starring Tony Martin, Gloria Stuart, and Henry Armetta.

Plot
A rodeo rider from Montana stranded in New York City with no money, Steve Bishop can't pay for his meal at Papa and Mama Gambini's restaurant, so he offers to work off his debt as a waiter. When someone else interested in that job harasses Papa, he is flattened by Steve.

Eyewitnesses among the customers include a sportswriter, Julie Harrison, and her boyfriend, fight promoter Tom Walker. A chance is offered Steve to participate in a boxing exhibition with six men in a ring at once. He ends up the victor, raising money for a good cause supported by Papa.

Walker decides to promote Steve as a prizefighter, and he begins earning victories and money. Steve doesn't realize these fights have been fixed in advance. Julie teaches him a lesson the hard way, telling Steve's next opponent to deck him. Walker, no longer able to promote Steve as undefeated, sells Julie his contract for 25 cents. Under her guidance, he is able to upset Paulie Mitchell in his next fight, pleasing Papa and Julie both.

Cast
 Tony Martin as Steve Bishop
 Gloria Stuart as Julie Harrison
 Henry Armetta as Papa Gambini
 Kane Richmond as Paulie Mitchell
 Slim Summerville as Muldoon
 Robert Allen as Tom Walker

References

External links
Winner Take All (1939 film) at the Internet Movie Database

1939 films
American drama films
1939 drama films
Films directed by Otto Brower
American black-and-white films
20th Century Fox films
Films scored by Samuel Kaylin
1930s English-language films
1930s American films